HD 111232 b is an extrasolar planet that orbits at almost 2 AU with a minimum mass of 6.8 times that of Jupiter. This planet was discovered in the La Silla Observatory by Michel Mayor using the CORALIE spectrograph on 30 June 2003, along with six other planets, including HD 41004 Ab, HD 65216 b, HD 169830 c, HD 216770 b, HD 10647 b, and HD 142415 b.

An astrometric measurement of the planet's inclination and true mass was published in 2022 as part of Gaia DR3.

References

External links 
 

Exoplanets discovered in 2003
Giant planets
Musca (constellation)
Exoplanets detected by radial velocity
Exoplanets detected by astrometry